United Nations Security Council Resolution 64, adopted on December 28, 1948, noted that the Netherlands had not complied with the demands to release the President of the Republic of Indonesia and other political prisoners as issued in United Nations Security Council Resolution 63.  The Resolution demanded that the Netherlands set free these prisoners forthwith and report to the Council within 24 hours.

The resolution passed with eight votes in favour. Belgium, France and the United Kingdom abstained.

See also
United Nations Security Council Resolution 65
List of United Nations Security Council Resolutions 1 to 100 (1946–1953)

References
Text of the Resolution at undocs.org

External links
 

 0064
Indonesian National Revolution
 0064
 0064
1948 in Indonesia
December 1948 events